Husky is a line of hand tools, pneumatic tools, and tool storage products. Though founded in 1924, it is now best known as the house brand of The Home Depot, where it is exclusively sold. Its hand tools are manufactured for Home Depot by Stanley Black & Decker, Western Forge, Apex Tool Group, and Iron Bridge Tools. Its slogan is "The toughest name in tools." Home Depot also carries a higher end line of tools marked Husky Pro.

Husky hand tools were formerly manufactured exclusively in the United States but are now largely made in China and Taiwan. All Husky hand tools have a lifetime warranty. In the past, Home Depot had a program offering consumers an exchange of their broken Sears Craftsman or other brand of hand tool for a comparable Husky tool at no charge. This program has since been discontinued.

History 

Husky Wrench was founded in Milwaukee, Wisconsin on January 29, 1924 by Sigmund Mandl, who had immigrated to the United States from Czechoslovakia. By 1928, Husky had established a significant collaboration with the J.H. Williams Tool Group, with Williams distributing Husky wrenches in its mechanic's tool sets.

In January 1929, the Husky name was sold to the Olsen Manufacturing Company of Kenosha, Wisconsin. The company relocated to Kenosha and changed its name to the Husky Corporation. Mandl went on to work for Blackhawk Manufacturing  of Milwaukee.

Sometime before 1932, the Husky name was again sold, this time to the New Britain Machine Company of New Britain, Connecticut, which was purchased by Litton Industries in the 1970s. When Litton dissolved its hand tools division in the 1980s, it sold the Husky brand (and other assets, including the Blackhawk brand) to National Hand Tool. 

The Stanley Works acquired the Husky brand with its acquisition in 1986 of National Hand Tool. In October 1992, Stanley began supplying the Husky brand exclusively to The Home Depot, and sometime later transferred the rights to the name to Home Depot.

Budget brands 

Home Depot's Workforce brand of tools was a budget brand slotted below Husky in quality and cost. It has largely been phased out and replaced by the HDX brand of tools and supplies, introduced in 2012. These brands do not have lifetime warranties as Husky tools do.

Gallery

See also 

 Craftsman and Kobalt—Husky's primary retail competition
 Mastercraft—Canadian Tire's tool brand

References

External links 
 Husky Tools web site
 Alloy Artifacts: "Husky Wrench, the Common Sense Tool Company"

American brands
Store brands
Stanley Black & Decker brands
Tool manufacturing companies of the United States
Tool manufacturing companies of China
The Home Depot